Mindy Aloff (born December 1947 Philadelphia) is an American editor, journalist, essayist, and dance critic.

Life
She was educated at Philadelphia High School for Girls, and graduated from Vassar College, and University at Buffalo, The State University of New York with an M.A.
She married the poet Martin Steven Cohen, in 1968; they have one daughter, Ariel Nikiya, (1985).

Her work has appeared in The New Yorker, The New York Times, The Nation, The New Republic, The Jewish Daily Forward, The Threepenny Review, and Voice of Dance. 
Since 2000, she has taught as an adjunct member of the Dance faculty at Barnard College.

Awards
 1987 Whiting Award
 1990 Guggenheim Fellow
 Woodrow Wilson Fellow

Works

References

External links
"Author's website"
"A Conversation with Mindy Aloff", Fulle Circle Magazine, February 22, 2009
The Whiting Foundation profile

1947 births
American essayists
Barnard College faculty
Living people
Writers from Philadelphia
University at Buffalo alumni
Vassar College alumni